The Hyborian Age is a fictional period of Earth's history within the artificial mythology created by Robert E. Howard, serving as the  setting for the sword and sorcery tales of Conan the Barbarian.

The word "Hyborian" is derived from the legendary northern land of the ancient Greeks, Hyperborea and it is rendered as such in the earliest draft of Howard's essay "The Hyborian Age". Howard described the Hyborian Age taking place sometime after the sinking of Atlantis and before the beginning of recorded ancient history. Most later editors and adaptors such as L. Sprague de Camp and Roy Thomas placed the Hyborian Age around 10,000 BC. More recently, Dale Rippke proposed that the Hyborian Age should be placed further in the past, around 32,500 BC, prior to the beginning of the Last Glacial Maximum. Rippke's date, however, has since been disputed by Jeffrey Shanks, who argues for the more traditional placement at the end of the Last Glacial Maximum.

Howard had an intense love for history and historical dramas; however, at the same time, he recognized the difficulties and the time-consuming research needed in maintaining historical accuracy. By conceiving a timeless setting – a vanished age – and by carefully choosing names that resembled our history, Howard avoided the problem of historical anachronisms and the need for lengthy exposition.

Fictional history

Cataclysmic ancestors
Howard explained the origins and history of the Hyborian civilization in his essay "The Hyborian Age". The essay begins with the end of the Thurian Age (the setting for Howard's King Kull stories) and the destruction of its civilizations, Lemuria and Atlantis, by a geological cataclysm.

After this cataclysm, the surviving humans were reduced to a primitive state and a technological level hardly above the Neanderthal. Several such tribes migrated to the northern areas of what was left of the Thurian continent to escape destruction. They discovered the region to be safe, but covered with snow and already inhabited by a race of vicious white-furred apes. A vicious territorial war ensued until the humans drove the apes further North, past the Arctic Circle. Believing the apes were destined to perish, the humans turned to taming their harsh new home.

Hyborian ancestors
One thousand five hundred years later, the descendants of this initial group were called "Hyborians". They were named after their highest ranking god deity, Bori.  The essay mentions that Bori had actually been a great tribal chief of their past who had undergone deification. Their oral tradition remembered him as their leader during their initial migration to the north, though the antiquity of this man had been exaggerated.

By this point, the various related but independent Hyborian tribes had spread throughout the northern regions of their area of the world. Some of them were already migrating south at a "leisurely" pace in search of new areas in which to settle. The Hyborians had yet to encounter other cultural groups, but engaged in wars against each other. Howard describes them as a powerful and warlike race with the average individual being tall, tawny-haired, and gray-eyed. Culturally, they were accomplished artists and poets. Most of the tribes still relied on hunting for their nourishment. Their southern offshoots, however, had been practicing animal husbandry on cattle for centuries.

The only exception to their long isolation from other cultural groups came due to the actions of a lone adventurer, unnamed in the essay. He had traveled past the Arctic Circle and returned with news that their old adversaries, the apes, were never annihilated. They had instead evolved into apemen and, according to his description, were by then numerous. He believed they were quickly evolving to human status and would pose a threat to the Hyborians in the future. He attempted to recruit a significant military force to campaign against them, but most Hyborians were not convinced by his tales; only a small group of foolhardy youths followed his campaign. None of them returned.

Beginnings of the Hyborian Age
With the population of the Hyborian tribes continuing to increase, the need for new lands also increased. The Hyborians expanded outside their familiar territories, beginning a new age of wanderings and conquests. For 500 years, the Hyborians spread towards the south and the west of their nameless continent.

They encountered other tribal groups for the first time in millennia. They conquered many smaller clans of various origins. The survivors of the defeated clans merged with their conquerors, passing on their racial traits to new generations of Hyborians. The mixed-blooded Hyborian tribes were in turn forced to defend their new territories from pure-blooded Hyborian tribes which followed the same paths of migration. Often, the new invaders would wipe away the defenders before absorbing them, resulting in a tangled web of Hyborian tribes and nations with varying ancestral elements within their bloodlines.

The first organized Hyborian kingdom to emerge was Hyperborea. The tribe that established it entered their Neolithic age by learning to erect buildings in stone, largely for fortification. These nomads lived in tents made out of the hides of horses, but soon abandoned them in favor of their crude but durable stone houses. They permanently settled in fortified settlements and developed cyclopean masonry to further fortify their defensive walls.

The Hyperboreans were by then the most advanced of the Hyborian tribes and set out to expand their kingdom by attacking their backwards neighbors. Tribes who defended their territories lost them and were forced to migrate elsewhere. Others fled the path of Hyperborean expansion before ever engaging them in war. Meanwhile, the apemen of the Arctic Circle emerged as a new race of light-haired and tall humans. They started their own migration to the south, displacing the northernmost of the Hyborian tribes.

Rulers of the West
For the next thousand years, the warlike Hyborian nations advanced to become the rulers of the western areas of the nameless continent. They encountered the Picts and forced them back to the western wastelands, which would come to be known as the "Pictish Wilderness". Following the example of their Hyperborean cousins, other Hyborians migrated Southward and created their own kingdoms.

The southernmost of the early kingdoms was Koth, which was established north of the lands of Shem and soon started extending its cultural influence over the southern shepherds. Just south of the Pictish Wilderness was the fertile valley known as "Zing". The wandering Hyborian tribe which conquered it found other people already settled there. They included a nameless farming nation related to the people of the Shem and a warlike Pictish tribe who had previously conquered them. They established the kingdom of Zingara and absorbed the defeated elements into their tribe. Hyborians, Picts, and the unnamed kin of the Shemites would merge into a nation calling themselves Zingarans.

On the other hand, at the north of the continent, the fair-haired invaders from the Arctic Circle had grown in numbers and power. They continued their expansion south while in turn displacing defeated Hyborians to the south. Even Hyperborea was conquered by one of these barbarian tribes. But the conquerors here decided to maintain the kingdom with its old name, merged with the defeated Hyperboreans and adopted elements of Hyborian culture. The continuing wars and migrations would keep the state of the other areas of the continent for another five hundred years.

The world

The Hyborian Age was devised by author Robert E. Howard as the post-Atlantean setting of his Conan the Cimmerian stories, designed to fit in with Howard's previous and lesser known tales of Kull, which were set in the Thurian Age at the time of Atlantis. The name "Hyborian" is a contraction of the Greek concept of the land of "Hyperborea", literally "Beyond the North Wind". This was a mythical place far to the north that was not cold and where things did not age.

Howard's Hyborian epoch, described in his essay The Hyborian Age, is a mythical time before any civilization known to anthropologists. Its setting is prehistoric Europe and North Africa (with occasional references to Asia and other continents).

On a map Howard drew conceptualizing the Hyborian Age, his vision of the Mediterranean Sea is dry. The Nile, which he renamed the River Styx, takes a westward turn at right angles just beyond the Nile Delta, plowing through the mountains so as to be able to reach the Straits of Gibraltar. Although his Black Sea is also dry, his Caspian Sea, which he renames the Vilayet Sea, extends northward to reach the Arctic Ocean, so as to provide a barrier to encapsulate the settings of his stories. Not only are his Baltic Sea and English Channel dry, but most of the North Sea and a vast region to the west, easily including Ireland, are, too. Meanwhile, the west coast of Africa on his map lies beneath the sea.

Nations and landmarks
In his fantasy setting of the Hyborian Age, Howard created imaginary kingdoms to which he gave names inspired by or adapted from a variety of mythological and historical sources. Khitai is his version of China, lying far to the east, Corinthia is his name for a Hellenistic civilization, a name derived from the city of Corinth and reminiscent of the imperial fief of Carinthia in the Middle Ages. Howard imagines the Hyborian Picts occupying a large area in the northwest. The probable intended analogues are listed below; notice that the analogues are sometimes very generalized, and are portrayed by non-historical stereotypes. Most of these correspondences are drawn from "Hyborian Names", an appendix featured in Conan the Swordsman by L. Sprague de Camp and Lin Carter.

Deities
The Stygian followers of Set worship their deity with human sacrifice and actively venerate serpents, and Ishtar's worshippers follow the pleasures of the flesh. In Vendhya, the followers of Asura seek truth beyond the illusions of the physical world, and the Hyborian devotees of Mitra are almost Christian in their merging of asceticism with a commitment to compassion and justice.

Crom
Crom  is a deity in Robert E. Howard's fantasy tales of the Hyborian Age. He is acknowledged as the chief god by the lead character Conan, and his proto-Celtic Cimmerian people.

The name Crom is probably derived from the ancient Celtic deity Crom Cruach or Crom Dubh.

Crom is the chief god of the Cimmerian pantheon, and he lives on a great mountain, from where he sends forth doom or death. It is considered useless to call upon Crom, because he is a gloomy and savage god who hates weaklings. However, Crom gives a man courage, free will, and the strength to fight his enemies, which the Cimmerians believe is all that is needed from him. Crom doesn't care if individuals live or die, and his name is typically only invoked as an oath or curse. He is the only member of the Cimmerian pantheon named with any regularity.

Crom is never depicted as directly intervening or otherwise explicitly causing any event in the original Conan stories by Robert E. Howard. There is little consistent evidence in his works that Crom actually exists, in contrast to the demons and highly advanced aliens appearing in "The God in the Bowl" and "The Tower of the Elephant", while the story "The Phoenix on the Sword" implies that Set is one of H. P. Lovecraft's Great Old Ones. Howard's story "Black Colossus" features a princess vocally directed by Mitra to recruit Conan as her champion, but Crom makes no such appearances.

Crom is exclusively a Cimmerian god, with other civilizations paying him little attention, and Conan swearing with Crom's name immediately identifies him as a Cimmerian.

Mitra
Mitra is a personification of good, popular amongst people of the era.

He is probably loosely based on the Vedic and Zoroastrian figure by the same name, and in the Hyborian universe, his worship generally represents Christianity. In the essay "The Hyborian Age", Howard writes that followers of Mitra are urged to forgive their enemies (though many of them fail to do so). Mitra's religion is missionary; its adherents are sometimes martyred trying to spread their faith to hostile peoples.

Mitra's worship is dominant, effectively the state religion, in the Hyborian countries corresponding to modern Western Europe. In lands corresponding to Asia and Africa, Mitra is, at best, one god among many, and his worship is forbidden in Stygia (Egypt and North Africa).

Mitra is the chief god of most of the civilized Hyborian kingdoms, including Aquilonia, Ophir, Nemedia, Brythunia, Corinthia, and Zingara. His worshippers are monolatristic, since at least one tale depicts priests of Mitra recognizing the existence of Set. He is depicted as a "gentle" god. In Khoraja, which is on the border between the Hyborian kingdoms and the Shemite ones, the worship of Mitra was largely forgotten in favor of the Shemite gods – but in hours of great need, Khorajans still call on Mitra and are answered ("Black Colossus").

While Mitra and his followers are in general presented favorably in the Conan stories, in Howard's The Hour of the Dragon they intolerantly persecute followers of Asura. Conan, being a "barbarian", does not share this "civilized" prejudice and protects Asura's followers, who prove helpful later.

The Mitra cult never practices sacrifice and values aesthetic simplicity. Thus, his shrines are usually unadorned and feature little or no iconography except for a single idol. The idol itself has the appearance of an idealized, bearded male figure and is the primary object of worship. However, being omnipresent and incorporeal, Mitra is not considered to reside in the icon, nor share its appearance. He is also symbolically represented by a phoenix in Howard's writing, by an Ankh in the Age of Conan MMORPG, and by a bronze colossus in the survival video game Conan Exiles.

Mitra appears directly in Howard's "Black Colossus", where he speaks to Princess Yasmela of Khoraja and guides her in an hour of desperate danger. Mitra's involvement has a significant effect on Conan's career. Though he had never commanded more than a "company of cut-throats", Conan emerges as a victorious general in a historically important battle involving tens of thousands of soldiers. Though Conan's career would know many more ups and downs, this was an important step towards eventually becoming a king. From Mitra's point of view, Conan was evidently the best choice to defeat a sworn enemy of the Hyborian kingdoms.

See also

 Hyborian War

Footnotes

References

Bibliography

 
 
 
 
 

 

Robert E. Howard
Conan the Barbarian
Fantasy worlds
Fictional universes
Mythopoeia
Fictional elements introduced in 1932